Echium nervosum is a species of flowering plants of the family Boraginaceae. It is endemic to Madeira. The specific name nervosum is from Latin and means "veined".

Description
It is a compact woody shrub, average height , maximum height . The leaves are narrow, densely haired and silver green. Its flowers are pale blue to pale bluish rose and sit in an egg-shaped inflorescence.

References

Further reading
 Roberto Jardim, David Francisco: Flora Endémica da Madeira. Múchia Publicações, Funchal 2000, p. 96 
 Peter Sziemer: Eine kurze Naturgeschichte Madeiras. Francisco Ribeiro & Filhos, LDA, Funchal 2000 
 António da Costa, Luis de Franquinho: Madeira. Plantas e Flores. Francisco Ribeiro & Filhos, LDA, Funchal 2008, p. 173 

nervosum
Flora of Madeira
Endemic flora of Madeira
Endemic flora of Macaronesia